Kurd1 Channel (Kurd Yek) was an independent Kurdish satellite channel broadcasting from France and was founded by Kendal Nezan, head of the Kurdish Institute of Paris. Its European studios were based in France, Germany and Sweden. It started its broadcast on April 27, 2009 and ended December 31, 2012 due to economic reasons.

Programming
Kurd1 Channel gave space in its programming to news, cinema sport for the Kurds. Several agreements have already been made with 20th Century  Fox and Granada International to acquire broadcasting rights. Kurd1 also enjoys the support of Canal France International (CFI), of Mediatoon  International. Nevertheless, Kurd1 produces a substantial part of its programmes itself.

References

External links
 

Television stations in Kurdistan Region (Iraq)
Kurdish-language television stations
Television channels and stations established in 2009
Television channels and stations disestablished in 2012
2009 establishments in Iraqi Kurdistan
2012 disestablishments in Iraqi Kurdistan
Mass media in Paris
Kurdish culture in France